Theodemir, Theodemar, Theudemer or Theudimer was a Germanic name common among the various Germanic peoples of early medieval Europe. According to Smaragdus of Saint-Mihiel (9th century), the form Theudemar is Frankish and Theudemir is Gothic.

Theodemer (Frankish king), early 5th century
Theodemir (Ostrogothic king) (died 475), Ostrogothic king
Theodemir (Suebian king) (died 570), Suevic King of Galicia
Theodemir (Visigoth) (died 743), Visigothic nobleman
Theodemir (saint) (died 851), Spanish saint
Theodemar of Monte Cassino, abbot of Monte Cassino
Theodemir of Iria (died 847), bishop of Iria Flavia
Theodemir (bishop of Mondoñedo), flourished 972–77

Notes

See also
Teodomiro

Masculine given names
Germanic names